Simon Carr may refer to:
 Simon Carr (tennis)
 Simon Carr (cyclist)
 Simon Carr, author of the 2001 memoir, The Boys Are Back in Town, made into a film The Boys Are Back